Kari Hotakainen (born 9 January 1957 in Pori, Finland) is a Finnish writer. Hotakainen started his writing career as a reporter in Pori. In 1986, he moved to Helsinki. He became a full-time writer in 1996. He has two children with his wife, sound technician Tarja Laaksonen, whom he married in 1983. He has also worked as a copywriter and as a columnist for the Helsingin Sanomat.

Life and career
His father, Keijo Hotakainen, worked as a storekeeper and photographer while his mother, Meeri Ala-Kuusisto, worked as a sales clerk. Kari Hotakainen passed his matriculation examination in 1976 and graduated from Rautalampi High School the same year. He has a Bachelor of Arts.

Hotakainen kicked off his career as an author in the beginning of the 1980s by writing poetry. His debut collection Harmittavat takaiskut (Unfortunate setbacks) was published in 1982. From poetry, Hotakainen moved on to writing books for children and young adults and then on to writing novels for adults. Before he started writing full-time, Hotakainen worked as a news reporter, in the advertising department of WSOY, etc. Hotakainen's breakthrough came when he was nominated for the 1997 Finlandia Prize, for his semi-autobiographical work titled Klassikko (The Classic). In 2002, Hotakainen received the Finlandia Prize for his book titled Juoksuhaudantie (Battle Trench Avenue) published the same year. Later on, the book was turned into a movie with the same name. In 2004, Hotakainen received the Nordic Council's Literature Prize for the same book. In 2006, he received the Nordic Drama Award for his play Punahukka. Hotakainen has also written children's plays, radio dramas, newspaper columns and the scripts for a 10-part TV series titled Tummien vesien tulkit.

Hotakainen was seriously injured in a car accident on 3 March 2012.

Bibliography

Novels 

Buster Keaton: elämä ja teot (1991)
Bronks (1993)
Syntisäkki (1995)
Pariskunta, pukki ja pieni mies (1997)
Klassikko (1997)
Sydänkohtauksia, eli kuinka tehtiin Kummisetä (1999)
Juoksuhaudantie (2002) – Finlandia Prize winner 2002
Iisakin kirkko (2004)
Huolimattomat (2006) – nominated for the Finlandia Prize 2006.
Ihmisen osa (2009)

Poetry

Harmittavat takaiskut (1982)
Kuka pelkää mustaa miestä (1985)
Hot (1987)
Runokirja (1988)
Kalikkakasa, kootut runot (2000)

Children's and young adults' books 

Lastenkirja (1990)
Ritva (1997)
Näytän hyvältä ilman paitaa (2000)
Satukirja (2004)

Radio dramas

Puutteellinen (1996)
Hurmaus (1997)
Keihäänheittäjä (1997)
Tulisuihku (1999)
Sitten kun kaikki on ohi (2000)

Plays 

Hukassa on hyvä paikka (1999)
Sydänkohtauksia (2002)
Punahukka (2005)

TV series
Tummien vesien tulkit

References

 Kari Hotakainen, Iisakin kirkko, WSOY, Juva 2004
 Ismo Loivamaa, Kotimaisia nykykertojia 1–2, BTJ Kirjastopalvelu, Helsinki 2003

External links

Kari Hotakainen at WSOY
Presentation on the Nordic Council's Literature Prize site

1957 births
Living people
People from Pori
Writers from Satakunta
Finnish children's writers
Finnish dramatists and playwrights
20th-century Finnish poets
Finnish male novelists
Finnish-language poets
Finlandia Prize winners
Finnish columnists
Nordic Council Literature Prize winners
Finnish male poets
20th-century Finnish novelists
21st-century Finnish novelists
20th-century male writers
21st-century male writers